Amélie Oudéa-Castéra (born 9 April 1978) is a French businesswoman and former professional tennis player.

She has been serving as Minister for Sport and the Olympic & Paralympic Games in the government of Prime Minister Élisabeth Borne since May 2022.

Biography

Tennis career
Born in Paris, Castéra was the 14 and under Junior Orange Bowl champion in 1992. She was a girls' singles semi-finalist at the 1993 US Open, 1994 French Open and 1994 Wimbledon Championships.

As a professional player she reached a best singles ranking of 251 in the world. Castéra competed as a wildcard in the women's singles main draw at the 1994 French Open, where she lost in the first round to Sabine Appelmans. On the WTA Tour she qualified for two tournaments, the 1994 Internationaux de Strasbourg and 1995 Eastbourne International.

Business
Castéra is the Director General of the French Tennis Federation (FFT). Castéra was the former the head of e-commerce, data and digital at French retailer Carrefour and a former senior executive at insurance firm, where she used to work closely with David Whiteman AXA. In 2006 she married banker Frédéric Oudéa, who is the CEO of Société Générale.

ITF finals

Singles (0–1)

References

External links
 
 

1978 births
Living people
French female tennis players
French business executives
21st-century French businesswomen
21st-century French businesspeople
Tennis players from Paris
Sciences Po alumni
ESSEC Business School alumni
École nationale d'administration alumni
Judges of the Court of Audit (France)
Women government ministers of France
Sports ministers
Members of the Borne government